Emin Sulimani (born 4 August 1986 in Wels) is an Austrian retired football midfielder. He is currently assistant manager of Hertha Wels.

He is of Albanian descent and he has a younger brother, Benjamin Sulimani.

Coaching career
After two season as manager for the reserve team of Hertha Wels, Sulimani became assistant manager of the first team ahead of the 2018-19 season under manager Stephan Kuranda. Among others, Sulimani coached one of his younger brothers, Harun Sulimani, who played for the first team. On 1 April 2019, manager Kuranda was fired and Sulimani was appointed caretaker manager for the rest of the season. Markus Waldl was appointed manager of the club at the end of the season, and Sulimani continued in his assistant manager role.

References

External links
Emin Sulimani at Footballdatabase

Emin Sulimani at ÖFB

1986 births
SV Ried players
FK Austria Wien players
LASK players
FC Admira Wacker Mödling players
Austrian Football Bundesliga players
2. Liga (Austria) players
Living people
Albanian footballers from North Macedonia
Austrian footballers
Austrian people of Albanian descent
Austrian people of Macedonian descent
Association football midfielders
People from Wels
Footballers from Upper Austria